Louisiana Highway 819 (LA 819) is a collection of five state-maintained streets located in the Lincoln Parish village of Choudrant that have a total length of .  All five routes were established in the 1955 Louisiana Highway renumbering and are presently unsigned.



Louisiana Highway 819-1

Louisiana Highway 819-1 (LA 819-1) runs  in a north–south direction along Oak Street from LA 819-5 (North Depot Street) to a dead end north of US 80.  It is an undivided two-lane highway for its entire length.

Louisiana Highway 819-2

Louisiana Highway 819-2 (LA 819-2) runs  in a north–south direction along Pecan Street from LA 819-3 (Green Street) to US 80.  The route travels alongside Choudrant High School and is an undivided two-lane highway for its entire length.

Louisiana Highway 819-3

Louisiana Highway 819-3 (LA 819-3) runs  in an east–west direction along Green Street from LA 819-2 (Pecan Street) to LA 819-1 (Oak Street).  It is an undivided two-lane highway for its entire length.

Louisiana Highway 819-4

Louisiana Highway 819-4 (LA 819-4) runs  in an east–west direction along Allen Street from LA 819-1 (Oak Street) to LA 145 (Elm Street).  It is an undivided two-lane highway for its entire length.

Louisiana Highway 819-5

Louisiana Highway 819-5 (LA 819-5) runs  in an east–west direction along North Depot Street from LA 819-1 (Oak Street) to LA 145 (Elm Street).  It is an undivided two-lane highway for its entire length.

See also

References

External links

La DOTD State, District, and Parish Maps

0819
Transportation in Lincoln Parish, Louisiana